Palgut is a surname. Notable people with the surname include:

Filip Palgut (born 1991), Slovak volleyball player
Karyn Palgut (born 1962), American handball player